Peter James Grant (1943 – 16 April 1990) was a British ornithologist. He was the third chairman of the British Birds Rarities Committee, from 1976 to 1986.

Publications 

 "The New Approach to Identification" (co-authored by Killian Mullarney)
 "Gulls, an identification guide"
 "Collins Bird Guide" (co-authored by Lars Svensson, published posthumously)

See also

 Peter R. Grant

1943 births
1990 deaths
British ornithologists
20th-century British zoologists